Scouter Nicholas Rozario, Ex-Unit Leader of St. Gregory's High School Scout Troop. He served the troop from 1947 to 1974.

J. S. Wilson, Director of the Boy Scouts International Bureau, visited Karachi in 1952 as guest of J.D. Shuja, the General Secretary of the Pakistan Boy Scouts Association.[3] During his visit, he saw Bhit Island, off Karachi, a fishing community primarily of refugees, who had been adopted by a Karachi Scout group, the Rovers and older Scouts of which were staffing a school until a regular teacher could be appointed. In Bahawalpur, Wilson was welcomed by Brigadier M.A. Abbasi, Deputy Chief Scout Commissioner who had been at the 1951 World Jamboree in Austria and would later lead the Pakistani contingent at the 1957 Jubilee Jamboree. At Lahore, Wilson met the Scouts and Bluebirds (Brownies) of the Deaf and Dumb Institute, and visited A.R. Sardar Hussain, Scout Camp Chief for Pakistan, Squadron Leader H.V. Bhatty, Scout Provincial Secretary, Nicholas Rozario, Deputy Camp Chief (East Pakistan), and Mir M. Mohsin, Deputy Camp Chief (West Pakistan), who later succeeded Shuja as General Secretary.

International Scouting leaders
People from Karachi